Qıçatan (also, Kichatan and Kychatan) is a village and municipality in the Ismailli Rayon of Azerbaijan.  It has a population of 148.

References 

Populated places in Ismayilli District